Gateway Casinos Sault Ste. Marie (formerly OLG Casino Sault Ste. Marie) is a casino in Sault Ste. Marie, Ontario.  Owned an Operated by Burnaby based Gateway Casinos & Entertainment, it was Northern Ontario's first full-time casino when it opened in 1999.  The casino is located near the International Bridge which links the city to Sault Ste. Marie, Michigan.

Facilities 
Food and beverage facilities offered by the casino include a 100-seat restaurant and a bar. There currently are no accommodations or entertainment facilities on site, making it difficult for the facility to compete with the other casinos in its local market located minutes away in the State of Michigan. The current casino facility has been housed in a temporary movable dome structure since opening in 1999 and has required numerous repairs due to its long-term use. Although the City of Sault Ste. Marie is currently home to the Ontario Lottery and Gaming Corporation, much like its past financial decision to operate two offices, the corporate office based in Toronto currently has no long-term plans for a permanent presence in the Northern Ontario city in the form of any significant investment into any permanent structures.

Facts and figures 
Casino floor size: 
Slot machines: 360
Table games: 9
Restaurants: 1
Bars: 1

Drinking age as an attraction 
The casino derives some of its customers from the United States, in part because the drinking age in Ontario is 19, as opposed to 21 in Michigan.

See also
List of casinos in Canada

References
 Ontario's Top Attractions - TransCanadaHighway.com
 Casino Sault. Ste. Marie - Ontario Lottery and Gaming Corporation
 Casino Sault. Ste. Marie - Tourism Sault. Ste. Marie
 Future Development In Doubt - Sault This Week

External links

 Gateway Casinos Sault Ste. Marie

Buildings and structures in Sault Ste. Marie, Ontario
Casinos in Ontario
Tourist attractions in Algoma District